Juliette C. Wells (born December 26, 1974) is an American author, editor, and Jane Austen scholar. She is the Elizabeth Conolly Todd Distinguished Professor of English in the Center for the Humanities at Goucher College. In 2015, Wells served as the chair of the English department at Goucher. Her work focuses on women's writing and 18th and 19th century British literature, especially that of Jane Austen.

Education 
Wells earned a Bachelor of Arts, Bachelor of Music, and a Master of Arts degree from Johns Hopkins University in 1997. She obtained a Master of Arts degree and a Master of Philosophy at Yale University in 2000. In 2003, she completed her doctorate at Yale. Under her doctoral advisor Ruth Yeazell, she completed her dissertation entitled Accomplished Women: Gender, Artistry, and Authorship in Nineteenth-Century England.

Career 
Wells' work focuses on women's writing and 18th and 19th century British literature, especially that of Jane Austen. She has also written works on Charlotte Brontë. She is the editor of three Penguin Books editions of Jane Austen works. In 2009, Wells was an associate professor of English at Manhattanville College. From 2009 to 2010 she was the Goucher College Burke Jane Austen Scholar-in-Residence. In 2015, she served as the chair of the English department at Goucher. As of 2018, she is the Elizabeth Conolly Todd Distinguished Professor of English in the Center for the Humanities at Goucher. Wells is a member of the Modern Language Association, American Society for Eighteenth-Century Studies, and the Society for the History of Authorship, Reading and Publishing. In 2013, she joined the editorial board of the Jane Austen Society of North America.

Selected works

Books

Editor

References 

1977 births
20th-century American women writers
21st-century American women writers
Academics from Maryland
American book editors
Goucher College faculty and staff
Jane Austen scholars
Johns Hopkins University alumni
Living people
Manhattanville College faculty
American women editors
Yale University alumni